Brigada 6 Operații Speciale "Mihai Viteazul" (English: 6th Special Operations Brigade "Mihai Viteazul") is a Romanian Land Forces special operations brigade formed on 25 October 2011 by the expansion of the former 1st Special Operations Regiment (composed of two special forces battalions and one supporting paratrooper battalion) with an additional logistics battalion to facilitate independent operations. It is headquartered in Târgu Mureș and subordinated to the General Staff of the Romanian Land Forces.

History 
The Mihai Viteazul Brigade headquarters are located in Târgu Mureș, Mureș County, in the historical region of Transylvania. It is composed of 610th Special Operations Battalion "Vulturi", 620th Special Operations Battalion "Băneasa-Otopeni", 630th Paratroopers Battalion "Smaranda Brăescu", and 640th Logistic Battalion. An earlier structure, under the name of Regimentul 1 Operații Speciale (1st Special Operations Regiment) was established on 1 August 2009.

In the late 1990s, the Romanian Armed Forces considered the possibility of creating a unified special operations force. The Romanian Joint Chiefs of Staff had discussions in which they sought to decide whether to keep the existing orders of battle of elite units incorporated into each separate category of forces (ground forces, the air force and the navy), or to create a new, integrated unit. They decided on the latter plan, especially considering the (at that time) future integration of Romania into NATO.

Rapid changes took place soon after the September 11, 2001 attacks, when the decision was made to create this new unit.

Selection started in 2003. Four allied nations—the United States, the United Kingdom, Israel, and Turkey—advised in the selection process, incorporating their experience into the new SOF battalion – Batalionul 1 Operații Speciale "Vulturi".

In preparation for the creation of the military unit, several elite units were disbanded. These included the 119th Recon Battalion in Oradea, the 56th Para battalion in Caracal–Deveselu, the 64th Para battalion at Titu–Boteni, and the 62nd para battalion in Câmpia Turzii. All but the last were elite units that participated in a large number of international exercises, as well as deployments abroad.

Structure

 6th Special Operations Brigade "Mihai Viteazul" in Târgu Mureș
 610th Special Operations Battalion "Vulturii" (Eagles) in Târgu Mureș
 620th Special Operations Battalion "Băneasa–Otopeni" in Buzău
 630th Paratroopers Battalion "Smaranda Brăescu" in Bacău
 640th Logistic Battalion in Târgu Mureș

Batalionul 610 Operații Speciale "Vulturii"
The Batalionul 1 Operații Speciale "Vulturii", nowadays Batalionul 610 Operații Speciale "Vulturi" (English: 610th Special Operations Battalion The Eagles) was created on 1 March 2003. Battalion became operational in late 2005, after several batches of graduates had already been selected. Members of the SOF battalion have benefitted from courses abroad, such as the US Army Special Forces course, the Force Recon course of the United States Marine Corps, as well as other courses. The US Army Special Forces also sent several instructors who were stationed in Romania for periods of up to 6 months at a time. The Turkish Special Forces were also heavily involved in advising on the selection process, due to the high number of exercises previously held in common with various units in Romania. The United Kingdom and Israel also sent instructors, although it is unclear from which units they came.

Special operations battalion became fully operational in 2007, with a company having been already active since 2006. Elements of the battalion were deployed in Afghanistan. A notable casualty of this deployment was Captain (posthumously Major) Tiberius-Marcel Petre, who was killed in a firefight. He was posthumously awarded the Order of the Star of Romania and the U.S. Bronze Star Medal.

Asked if members of the unit will take part in real missions abroad, the former Minister of National Defense Teodor Atanasiu replied "with certainty".

Batalionul 610 was renamed from Batalionul 1 on October 25, 2011.

Batalionul 620 Operații Speciale "Băneasa–Otopeni"

The formerly known as Batalionul 60 Parașutiști "Băneasa–Otopeni" (60th Paratroopers Battalion "Băneasa–Otopeni") is the main paratrooper unit of the Romanian Land Forces. It was originally formed in 1941. It was previously subordinated to the 1st Territorial Army Corps, and its headquarters are located in Buzău. The battalion was part of the 2nd Paratroopers Brigade (HQ Clinceni), which was disbanded in 2005 due to a reorganization program of the Romanian Land Forces, in order to reach NATO standards. Batalionul 60 Parașutiști "Băneasa–Otopeni" was renamed Batalionul 620 Operații Speciale in 2011.

Their first foreign operation came in 2009 in Kosovo, where an 86-man unit was deployed. The unit was equipped with URO VAMTAC vehicles.

Batalionul 630 Paraşutişti "Smaranda Brăescu"
The formerly known as Batalionul 498 Paraşutiști "Smaranda Brăescu" (498th Paratroopers Battalion) is a paratroopers battalion of the Romanian Land Forces, established on 30 November 1990. It was previously subordinated to the 4th Infantry Division (HQ Cluj-Napoca) and its headquarters are located at Bacău. The battalion was part of the 4th Para Brigade (HQ Bacau), which was disbanded in 2005 due to a reorganization program of the Romanian Land Forces, in order to reach NATO standards. Batalionul 498 Paraşutiști "Smaranda Brăescu" was renamed Batalionul 630 Parașutiști "Smaranda Brăescu" in 2011.

Batalionul 640 Logistic
Batalionul 640 Logistic (640th Logistics Battalion) is responsible for command and logistics support for Brigada 6 Operații Speciale "Mihai Viteazul".

Timeline
 Regimentul 1 Operații Speciale 1 August 2009 – 25 October 2011
 Brigada 6 Operații Speciale 25 October 2011 – present

References

External links
Official Site of the Romanian Land Forces

Military units and formations established in 2009
1st Special Operations
Batalionul 1 Operatii Speciale